Empire series may refer to:

 Galactic Empire series or Empire series by Isaac Asimov
 The Empire Duet or Empire series, two novels by Orson Scott Card
 Empire Trilogy, a series of novels by Raymond E. Feist and Janny Wurts
 Empire (2015 TV series)
 Empire (2012 TV series)
 Empire (2005 TV series)
 Empire (1962 TV series)
 Empire ship, a series of ships
 Empire (comics), a comic series
 Star Wars: Empire, a Star Wars comic series
 Empire (1977 video game), a series of commercial games, originally designed by Walter Bright
 Empire (1972 video game), a series of free games, originally designed by Peter Langston

See also
 Empire (disambiguation)